Canada Talks is a Canadian talk radio station, which airs on the satellite radio service Sirius XM Canada. The channel broadcasts talk programming, both original content and simulcasting of other broadcast services, relating to all aspects of Canadian life including business, politics, entertainment, lifestyle, health and sports.

The channel's daily morning program is National Post Radio, a collaboration with the National Post newspaper hosted by columnist Matt Gurney. Business programming on the channel is provided through simulcasts of Business News Network's programs Business Day, The Business News and Market Call.

Personalities currently heard on the channel with original programming include Arlene Bynon, Shaun Proulx, Christine Bentley, Kate Wheeler, Sharon Caddy, Amber MacArthur, Eric Alper and Evan Solomon.

The channel also broadcasts all Canadian Football League games, including the annual Grey Cup.

References

External links
 Canada Talks

XM Satellite Radio channels
Satellite radio stations in Canada
News and talk radio stations in Canada
Sirius XM Radio channels